Ceneselli is a comune (municipality) in the Province of Rovigo in the Italian region Veneto, located about  southwest of Venice and about  west of Rovigo. 
 
Ceneselli borders the following municipalities: Calto, Castelmassa, Castelnovo Bariano, Giacciano con Baruchella, Salara, Trecenta.

References

Cities and towns in Veneto